Yibeltal Aemero Alemu (born 21 May 1966) is an Ethiopian diplomat who is the current Ethiopian ambassador to Sudan. Prior to his current post, He has served as the Director General for Neighboring Countries and IGAD Affairs under the Ministry of Foreign Affairs of Ethiopia.

Life and Education
Yibeltal pursued his undergraduate studies at Addis Ababa University. He studied Political Science and International Relations and received his BA degree in 1990. After graduating, he joined the Ministry of Foreign Affairs and has been serving in various diplomatic roles and positions.

In 2011, He earned an MA degree in International Relations with International Law at University of Kent in the United Kingdom.

Yibeltal is married and is the father of three children.

Career
In 1991, Yibeltal joined the Ministry of Foreign Affairs. In 1993, He was assigned as the Third Secretary at the Ethiopian Embassy in Pyongyang, Democratic People's Republic of Korea and served at the post until 1996. Following that, in 1996, He took the role of a Desk Officer of Somalia, Great Lakes Region and Egypt under the Ethiopian Ministry of Foreign Affairs and served until 1998. Yibeltal was then assigned as the Desk Officer of Sudan and Uganda from 1998 to 2003.

In 2003, he took the position of First Secretary and First Counselor at the Ethiopian Embassy in Khartoum, Sudan for a period of four years. After serving in Sudan, he was  the First Counselor in charge of Peace and Security of the African Union at the Ministry of Foreign Affairs until 2010.

After serving as the Consul General of the Federal Democratic Republic of Ethiopia to Dubai and Northern Emirates from 2014 to 2018, Yibeltal was the Director for IGAD Affairs, Neighboring Countries and IGAD Affairs Directorate General. Shortly after, he was promoted to be the Director General at the Office of the Chief of Cabinet of the Ministry of Foreign Affairs of Ethiopia. In November 2018, he became the Director General for Neighboring Countries and IGAD Affairs until July 2020.

Since July 2020, Yibeltal has served as the Ambassador Extraordinary and Plenipotentiary of Ethiopia to the Republic of Sudan by President of Ethiopia Sahle-Work Zewde. He recently has been actively engaged in mediating on the border dispute between Ethiopia and Sudan.

See also
List of ambassadors of Ethiopia

References

1966 births
Living people
Ethiopian diplomats
Addis Ababa University alumni
Ambassadors of Ethiopia